Thiocoraline is a microbial natural product of the depsipeptide class. Thiocoraline was isolated from the mycelium cake of a marine actinomycete strain L-13-ACM2-092. In vitro, thiocoraline causes an arrest in G1 phase of the cell cycle and decreases the rate of S phase progression towards G2/M phase. Thiocoraline is likely to be a DNA replication inhibitor.  Thiocoraline is produced on a nonribosomal peptide synthetase (NRPS) assembly line.

References 

Depsipeptides